Fuller Pilch (17 March 1804 – 1 May 1870) was an English first-class cricketer, active from 1820 to 1854. He was a right-handed batsman who bowled at a slow pace with a roundarm action. Pilch played in a total of 229 first-class matches for an assortment of teams, but mostly for Norfolk and Kent. He is remembered as a pioneer of forward play in batting, and especially for a shot called "Pilch's poke".

Early life
Pilch was born at Horningtoft, Norfolk, the third son of Nathaniel Pilch and his wife Frances (née Fuller). They had been married at Brisley and returned to live there when Pilch was young.

His father was a cobbler and Pilch himself became a tailor. He followed in the footsteps of his two elder brothers, Nathaniel and William, and became a professional cricketer.

Cricket career
Pilch's first appearance at Lord's was a three-day match in July 1820, playing for Norfolk. He then went to Sheffield to play cricket and earn his living as a tailor.

By the late 1820s, he had become the finest batsman in England and acquired the nickname, "the non pareil [unrivalled] hitter".

He appeared 23 times in Gentlemen v Players matches.

In 1833, in highly publicised single wicket matches, Pilch twice defeated Tom Marsden, another prominent batsman of the time.

In 1835, he moved to Town Malling in Kent and received a salary of 100 pounds a year. There he kept a tavern attached to the cricket ground.

Pilch moved to Canterbury in 1842 where he kept the Saracen's Head. He served as the first groundsman of the St Lawrence Ground from 1847 to 1868.

Style and technique
Pilch was described as "the greatest batsman ever known until the appearance of W. G. Grace". An early pioneer of batting, Pilch's method of playing the ball forward is seen as an early manifestation of modern batting practices. The main characteristic of his batting was his forward play, using a shot that was called "Pilch's poke".

Writing in 1862 in his Scores and Biographies, Arthur Haygarth called Pilch "the best batsman that has ever yet appeared". Haygarth further wrote: "His style of batting was very commanding, extremely forward, and he seemed to rush to the best bowling by his long forward play before it had time to shoot or rise, or do mischief by catches".

Though his statistics may seem fairly ordinary as reflected by modern standards, the ten centuries he amassed throughout his entire club and first-class playing career were considered "remarkable" in the context of the roundarm bowling and poorly maintained cricket pitches he encountered during his career.

As to the question of how Pilch would compare with the greatest of his successors, editor Sydney Pardon wrote in W. G. Grace's obituary in the 1916 edition of Wisden:

Pilch died at Canterbury in 1870. He never married.

Legacy

Besides his two brothers, Pilch's nephew William Pilch also played first-class cricket.

In June 2008, it was reported in The Times that Pilch's grave in St Gregory's churchyard in Canterbury was preventing the development of the churchyard into a Canterbury Christ Church University concert hall, as it could not be located for removal. Soon afterwards, the grave was located through the use of an old photograph and the memories of local people.

In the novel Flashman's Lady by George MacDonald Fraser, Pilch is caught and bowled by Harry Flashman in a fictional game at Lord's between Rugby Old Boys and Kent in 1842.

Pilch is mentioned in the song "Gentlemen and Players" on the 2009 cricket concept album The Duckworth Lewis Method, created by Irish duo Thomas Walsh and Neil Hannon.

References

External links
 
 Horningtoft Heritage Society Site (NB: this is a straight copy of an earlier version of the Wikipedia article)

1804 births
1870 deaths
A to K v L to Z cricketers
All-England Eleven cricketers
Cambridge Town Club cricketers
English cricketers of 1787 to 1825
English cricketers of 1826 to 1863
English cricketers
Fast v Slow cricketers
Gentlemen cricketers
Gentlemen of England cricketers
Gentlemen of Kent cricketers
Gentlemen of Nottinghamshire cricketers
Gentlemen of Sussex cricketers
Hampshire cricketers
Kent cricketers
Left-Handed v Right-Handed cricketers
Married v Single cricketers
Marylebone Cricket Club cricketers
Non-international England cricketers
Norfolk cricketers
North v South cricketers
Over 30s v Under 30s cricketers
People from Brisley
Players cricketers
Suffolk cricketers
Surrey cricketers
Sussex cricketers
West of England cricketers